The FN 303 P is a semi-automatic less-lethal pistol designed and manufactured by Fabrique Nationale de Herstal. It uses the same .68 Less-lethal cartridge as the FN 303, the less-lethal riot gun by FN Herstal.

Overview

The FN 303 P is the pistol version of the FN 303, and is intended for use by police and military forces for riot control. It uses the 8.5 gram, .68 caliber less-lethal cartridges by FN. The projectiles utilize a fin-stabilized polystyrene body and a non-toxic bismuth forward payload to provide more accuracy and greater effective range. There are currently five different factory standard types of the projectile: Clear impact (training), washable paint, indelible paint, PAVA/OC Powder and Inert powder.

History

The FN 303 P is based on the FN 303 riot gun, and was first shown at the 2010 SHOT  Show.

References

External links

 

 FN 303 P
Weapons of Belgium